Paavo Paajanen (born 25 April 1988) is a Finnish former racing cyclist. He finished in second place in the Finnish National Road Race Championships in 2011 and 2013.

References

External links

1988 births
Living people
Finnish male cyclists
Place of birth missing (living people)